Jorma Lehtosalo (born June 23, 1945 in Helsinki) is a Finnish sprint canoer who competed in the late 1960s and early 1970s. Competing in two Summer Olympics, he earned his best finish of fifth in the K-4 1000 m event at Mexico City in 1968.

References
Sports-reference.com profile

1945 births
Living people
Sportspeople from Helsinki
Canoeists at the 1968 Summer Olympics
Canoeists at the 1972 Summer Olympics
Finnish male canoeists
Olympic canoeists of Finland